Carlos Walter Galán Barry (May 31, 1925 – January 25, 2003) was a prelate of the Catholic Church. He served as auxiliary bishop of Morón from 1981 till 1991, when he became archbishop of La Plata, which he remained till his resignation in 2000 on reaching the age of 75.

Life 
Born in Nueve de Julio, Galán Barry was ordained to the priesthood on September 19, 1953.

On February 11, 1981, he was appointed auxiliary bishop of Buenos Aires and titular bishop of Cediae. Galán Barry received his episcopal consecration on the following March 25 from Raúl Francisco Cardinal Primatesta, archbishop of Córdoba, with the bishop of Morón, Justo Oscar Laguna, and the bishop of San Justo, Jorge Carlos Carreras, serving as co-consecrators.

On May 8, 1991, he was appointed archbishop of La Plata, where he was installed on the following July 27. He would serve in this position for nearly 9 years, retiring on June 12, 2000, upon reaching the age of 75.

As a bishop he was principal consecrator of Guillermo José Garlatti, archbishop of Bahía Blanca, and Martín de Elizalde, bishop of Nueve de Julio.

He died on January 25, 2003.

References

External links 
 Entry about Carlos Walter Galán Barry at catholic-hierarchy.org

1925 births
2003 deaths
20th-century Roman Catholic archbishops in Argentina
Roman Catholic bishops of Morón
Roman Catholic archbishops of La Plata in Argentina